David Matthew Dickie (born September 5, 1829) was a merchant, ship owner and political figure in Nova Scotia, Canada. He represented Kings County in the Nova Scotia House of Assembly from 1867 to 1871 as a Liberal member.

He was born in Cornwallis, Nova Scotia, the son of Charles Dickie, formerly a member of the Legislative Council, and Sarah Tupper. In 1853, Dickie married Kate Howe Fellows. He later served as registrar of deeds.

References 

 

1829 births
Year of death missing
Nova Scotia Liberal Party MLAs